Jinlong station is a station on Line 14 of Shenzhen Metro in Shenzhen, Guangdong, China, which opened on 28 October 2022. It is located in Pingshan District.

Station layout

Exits

References

External links
 Shenzhen Metro Jinlong Station (Chinese)
 Shenzhen Metro Jinlong Station (English)

Railway stations in Guangdong
Shenzhen Metro stations
Railway stations in China opened in 2022